John L. Templeman (March 11, 1872 – October 19, 1936) was a college football player and prominent attorney.

Grinnell College
Templeman attended Grinnell College (then called Iowa College) before 1897.

University of Virginia
Templeman was a prominent center for the Virginia Cavaliers football team of the University of Virginia. He also kicked field goals.

1897
Templeman played in the game in which Richard Von Albade Gammon died in 1897.

1898
Templeman was selected All-Southern by W. A. Lambeth in Outing.

Butte
He came to Butte, Montana in 1900, and in 1903 was appointed city attorney.

References

External links

1872 births
1936 deaths
Virginia Cavaliers football players
American lawyers
American football centers
Sportspeople from Butte, Montana
People from Axminster
Grinnell Pioneers football players
All-Southern college football players
19th-century players of American football